The New World People's Party was a short-lived Hungarian political party between 2020 and 2022. It was founded by József Pálinkás, the former Minister of Education under Viktor Orbán and former member of Fidesz.

References

2020 establishments in Hungary
2022 disestablishments in Hungary
Defunct political parties in Hungary
Conservative parties in Hungary
Opposition to Viktor Orbán
Pro-European political parties in Hungary
Political parties established in 2020
Political parties disestablished in 2022